Catherine Louise Hutchesson is an Australian politician. She has been a Labor Party member of the South Australian House of Assembly since the 2022 state election, representing Waite. The constituency had been held by the Liberal Party for the previous 29 years, and its predecessor, the seat of Mitcham, had only ever been held by Liberal or independent members dating back to 1938. Hutchesson had been the Labor candidate for the same seat in the 2018 state election.

Personal life and career
Hutchesson grew up in Glenalta and has lived in the district for more than forty years. She worked at the Blackwood Fitness Centre, studied community service at the Panorama campus of TAFE South Australia, and studied at Flinders University where she graduated with a Bachelor of Science. She also studied at the Regency Hotel School, where she qualified as a chef. After moving to the banking and finance sector she became an industrial advocate for the Finance Sector Union. She is also a volunteer firefighter with the Country Fire Service (CFS), and has been vice-president of the Upper Sturt CFS Brigade, and the representative of her brigade to the CFS Volunteers' Association and delegate to the CFS Group that includes Upper Sturt. She was president of the Upper Sturt Soldiers' Memorial Hall committee, and is also involved with the Country Women's Association.

Political career
Hutchesson was the Labor Party candidate for the South Australian House of Assembly electoral district of Waite at the 2018 state election, when she received 42.2 per cent of the two-party-preferred vote (2PP) from 23.5 per cent of the first-preference votes. A post-election redistribution notionally lifted her first-preference vote to 24 per cent, and a 2PP of 42.6 per cent. The constituency had been held by the Liberal Party since 1993, its predecessor, the seat of Mitcham, had only ever been held by Liberal or independent members dating back to 1938,   and was regarded as a blue-ribbon Liberal seat.

She was again the Labor Party candidate for Waite at the 2022 state election, when she received 54 per cent of the 2PP, achieving an 11.4 per cent swing to the Labor Party. Her share of the first-preference votes was 26.6 per cent.

Since 3 May 2022 she has been a member of the parliamentary Natural Resources Committee.

Footnotes

References
 
 
 
 
 

Living people
Women members of the South Australian House of Assembly
21st-century Australian women politicians
Australian Labor Party members of the Parliament of South Australia
Year of birth missing (living people)
Flinders University alumni